Peplow Hall is a privately owned , 18th-century country house at Peplow, near Hodnet, Shropshire. It is the seat of The Waters family and is a Grade II* listed building.

The manor of Peplow was owned in the 17th century by Hugh Pigot (1631–1697). A later Hugh Pigot replaced the old manor house with a new hall in about 1725, which date is carried on the sundials adorning the central block of the present house. His grandson, Sir George Pigot Bt (1719–1783) the first of the Pigot Baronets, purchased Patshull Hall and sold Peplow to the Clegg family.

In 1831 Anne Clegg, then heiress of the estate, married Rowland Hill of Hawkstone Hall who later in 1842 succeeded to the title Viscount Hill. Hill experienced financial difficulties and in 1873 sold the estate to wealthy industrialist, coal owner and ironmaster Francis Stanier.

Stanier created the present house in 1877 by greatly enlarging the 1725 house. In 1877 he also built the adjacent Epiphany Chapel to a design by architect Richard Norman Shaw. The estate then extended to some  but was reduced by sales in the 20th century and in the 1920s the house and remaining land were offered for sale.

The house was substantially reduced in size in 1932. From about 1945  until 1963 the property was owned by Neville Howard Rollason, a director of the steelmaker John Summers and Sons at Shotton, and after his death it was sold to William B Higgin, son of a Liverpool cotton merchant who had been High Sheriff of Cheshire. Higgin sold the estate to Michael Wynn, 7th Baron Newborough and the hall is no longer the seat of the 8th Baron Newborough, having been sold in 2015.

As of 2015, the Hall is being marketed for £2.75M, with the entire estate taking offers in excess of £12.5M.

See also
Grade II* listed buildings in Shropshire Council (H–Z)
Listed buildings in Hodnet, Shropshire

References

Grade II* listed buildings in Shropshire
Country houses in Shropshire